Tyler Ross (born March 13, 1989) is an American actor best known for playing Kyle Stansbury in season four of the television series The Killing and for starring in the Stephen Cone films The Wise Kids (2011), Henry Gamble's Birthday Party (2015),  and Princess Cyd (2017).  Ross has also appeared in the series Boss, NCIS, Major Crimes, Crash & Bernstein, Battle Creek, and 9-1-1 and the films The Lovers (2017), Officer Downe (2016), American Milkshake (2013), and Nate & Margaret (2012).

Filmography

Film

Television

References

External links

1989 births
Living people
American male film actors
American male television actors
Male actors from Chicago
Place of birth missing (living people)